Arlington Heights is a neighborhood in the southern portion of Pittsburgh, Pennsylvania.  The zip code used by residents is 15210, and this neighborhood is represented on the Pittsburgh City Council by the council member for District 3 (Central South Neighborhoods).  This neighborhood is home to five government housing projects.

Twenty Second Street Incline
Arlington Heights was once connected to the mills along the Monongahela River by the Twenty Second Street Incline, which ran from Josephine Street to Salisbury Street, near the location of Fort McKinley.

Surrounding Pittsburgh neighborhoods
Arlington Heights has only two borders with the Pittsburgh neighborhoods of the South Side Slopes to the northwest and Arlington to the northeast, south and southwest.

References

Further reading

See also
 List of Pittsburgh neighborhoods

External links
Interactive Pittsburgh Neighborhoods Map
Neighborhoods in Pittsburgh